Jeff Gee Gladney (December 12, 1996 – May 30, 2022) was an American football cornerback of the National Football League (NFL) for two seasons. He played college football at the Texas Christian University and was a two time all-conference selection in the Big 12. He was selected by the Minnesota Vikings in the first round of the 2020 NFL Draft. He signed with the Arizona Cardinals in 2022, but never played for the team.

High school career
Playing at New Boston High School in New Boston, Texas, Gladney was a three-star recruit and signed with Texas Christian University (TCU) to play college football for the TCU Horned Frogs on February 5, 2015, after originally committing to the program on June 6, 2014. Gladney chose TCU over offers from North Texas, Northern Illinois, Rice, Texas State, Tulsa, and UTSA.

College career
Gladney redshirted his freshman year due to a torn anterior cruciate ligament sustained during his senior year in high school, but then was a four-year starter at Texas Christian University.  During his junior season, Gladney made waves as a cover corner, earning first-team all-Big 12 Conference by Pro Football Focus and second-team all-Big 12 by the coaches. He injured a meniscus before his senior season but played the whole year, waiting for surgery until after the conclusion of the season. Over his TCU career, he recorded five interceptions and was named to the 2020 Senior Bowl roster after his senior season as well as garnering first-team all-Big 12 honors by the Associated Press.

NFL draft evaluators praised Gladney for his physical style of play.

Professional career

Minnesota Vikings
Gladney was drafted by the Minnesota Vikings in the first round with the 31st overall pick in the 2020 NFL Draft.

Heading into his first training camp, Gladney competed for a starting job against Mike Hughes, Holton Hill, and fellow rookie Cameron Dantzler, and ended up starting every game of the 2020 season as cornerback from Week 2 onwards.  
In Week 6 against the Atlanta Falcons, Gladney recorded his first forced fumble on running back Brian Hill which was recovered by the Vikings during the 40–23 loss. Overall, Gladney finished the 2020 season with 81 total tackles, three passes defensed, and one forced fumble.

Gladney was released on August 3, 2021, after his indictment for domestic violence. In March 2022, he was found not guilty of the charges.

Arizona Cardinals
On March 16, 2022, Gladney signed with the Arizona Cardinals.

Personal life and death 

Gladney had one son, born in 2021. Gladney was close friends with fellow 2020 first round draft pick and current Minnesota Vikings wide receiver Jalen Reagor.

On May 30, 2022, Gladney and his girlfriend, Mercedes Palacios, were killed in a car crash in Dallas, Texas, at 2:30 am. Police reports indicated that Gladney's Mercedes SUV clipped a car, while traveling at an excessive speed; his vehicle then spun off the road, crashed into a brick wall, and ignited into flames.  Gladney was 25 years old; Palacios was 26.

References

External links
TCU Horned Frogs bio

1996 births
2022 deaths
21st-century African-American sportspeople
African-American players of American football
People from New Boston, Texas
Players of American football from Texas
American football cornerbacks
TCU Horned Frogs football players
Minnesota Vikings players
Arizona Cardinals players
Road incident deaths in Texas